Jens Juel may refer to:

People
 Jens Juel (diplomat) (1631–1700), Danish diplomat
 Jens Juel (painter) (1745–1802), Danish painter
 Jens Hermansson Juel (1580–1634), Danish nobleman
 Jens Juel-Vind (1694-1726), Baron of Juellinge, Danish chamberlain and landowner
 Jens Krag-Juel-Vind (1724-1776), Baron of Juellinge, Danish Supreme Court justice and landowner
 Jens Juel (1897–1978), owner of Petersgaard

Other uses
 Jens Juel series, notes of Danish krone

See also
 Juel (disambiguation)
 Jens (disambiguation)